Joseph Haydn's composed the Concerto per il Clarino (Hob. VIIe/1) (Trumpet Concerto in E-flat major) in 1796 for the trumpet virtuoso Anton Weidinger. Joseph Haydn was 64 years of age. A favourite of the trumpet repertoire, it has been cited as "possibly Haydn's most popular concerto". Although written in 1796, Weidinger first performed the concerto four years later on March 28, 1800.

Original instrument

Anton Weidinger developed a keyed trumpet which could play chromatically throughout its entire range. Before this, the trumpet was valveless and could only play a limited range of harmonic notes by altering the vibration of the lips; also called by the name of "natural trumpet". Most of these harmonic notes were clustered in the higher registers, so previous trumpet concertos could only play melodically with the high register (e.g., Bach's Brandenburg Concerto No. 2). Haydn's concerto includes melodies in the middle and lower register, exploiting the capabilities of the new instrument.

There were attempts all over Europe around the mid-classical era to expand the range of the trumpet using valves, but Weidinger's idea of drilling holes and covering them with flute-like keys was not a success as it had very poor sound quality. Thus the natural trumpet still had continual use in the classical orchestra while the keyed trumpet had barely any repertoire. The valved trumpets used today were first constructed and used in the 1830s.

Form

The work is composed in three movements (typical of a Classical period concerto), they are marked as follows:

In addition to the solo trumpet, the concerto is scored for an orchestra consisting of 2 flutes, 2 oboes, 2 bassoons, 2 horns, 2 (presumably natural) trumpets (which generally play in support of the horns or timpani rather than the solo trumpet), timpani, and strings.

In popular culture
In Hong Kong, this piece has been adopted as the theme of the sketch comedy Shanghai Woman (played by Lydia Shum) in TVB's variety show Enjoy Yourself Tonight. This piece has also been adopted in one of the songs of Wan Kwong.

The Trumpet Concerto's third movement was used in the popular Netflix TV Series, Squid Game.

See also
Michael Haydn also wrote a trumpet concerto, with the same two-movement form as Leopold Mozart's Trumpet Concerto.
Johann Nepomuk Hummel also wrote a trumpet concerto for Anton Weidinger.

References

External links 
 
 
 , Alison Balsom

1796 compositions
Haydn, Joseph
Concertos by Joseph Haydn
Compositions in E-flat major